Extrajudicial punishment is a punishment for an alleged crime or offense which is carried out without legal process or supervision by a court or tribunal through a legal proceeding.

Politically motivated
Extrajudicial punishment is often a feature of politically repressive regimes, but even self-proclaimed or internationally recognized democracies have been known to use extrajudicial punishment under certain circumstances.

Although the legal use of capital punishment is generally decreasing around the world, individuals or groups deemed threatening—or even simply "undesirable"—to a government may nevertheless be targeted for punishment by a regime or its representatives. Such actions typically happen quickly, with security forces acting on a covert basis, performed in such a way as to avoid a massive public outcry and/or international criticism that would reflect badly on the state.  Sometimes, the killers are agents outside the government.  Criminal organizations, such as La Cosa Nostra, have reportedly been employed for such a purpose.

Another possibility is for uniformed security forces to punish a victim, but under circumstances that make it appear as self-defense or suicide.  The former can be accomplished by planting recently fired weapons near the body, the latter by fabricating evidence suggesting suicide.  In such cases, it can be difficult to prove that the perpetrators acted wrongly. Because of the dangers inherent in armed confrontation, even police or soldiers who might strongly prefer to take an enemy alive may still kill to protect themselves or civilians, and potentially cross the line into extrajudicial murder.

A forced disappearance (or enforced disappearance) occurs when a person is secretly abducted or imprisoned by a state or political organization or by a third party with the authorization, support, or acquiescence of a state or political organization, followed by a refusal to acknowledge the person's fate and whereabouts, with the intent of placing the victim outside the protection of the law.

Extrajudicial punishment may be planned and carried out by a particular branch of a state, without informing other branches, or even without having been ordered to commit such acts. Other branches sometimes tacitly approve of the punishment after the fact.  They can also genuinely disagree with it, depending on the circumstances, especially when complex intragovernmental or internal policy struggles also exist within a state's policymaking apparatus.

In times of war, natural disaster, societal collapse, or in the absence of an established system of criminal justice, there may be increased incidences of extrajudicial punishment. In such circumstances, police or military personnel may be unofficially authorised to punish severely individuals involved in looting, rioting and other violent acts, especially if caught in flagrante delicto.  This position is sometimes itself corrupted, resulting in the death of merely inconvenient persons, that is, relative innocents who are just in the wrong place at the wrong time.

Around the world

Historically

Wyatt Earp led a federal posse, in the Earp Vendetta Ride, during the spring of 1882 which was  implicated in the murder of four outlaw "Cowboys" they believed had ambushed his brothers Virgil and Morgan Earp, maiming the former and killing the latter.

The NKVD troika  and Special Council of the NKVD  are examples from the history of the Soviet Union, where extrajudicial punishment "by administrative means" was part of the state policy. Other Soviet Bloc secret police organizations like the East German Stasi, Romanian Securitate have also used it from time to time.

Most Latin American dictatorships have regularly instituted extrajudicial killings of their enemies; for one of the better-known examples, see Operation Condor.

The deaths of the leaders of the leftist urban guerrilla group, the Red Army Faction, Ulrike Meinhof, Andreas Baader, Gudrun Ensslin and Jan-Carl Raspe in West Germany are regarded by some of those in the radical left movements as extrajudicial killings, a theory partly based on the testimony of Irmgard Möller.

During the apartheid years (from 1948 until the early 1990s), South Africa's security forces were also accused of using extrajudicial means to deal with their political opponents. After his release, Nelson Mandela would refer to these acts as proof of a Third Force. This was denied vehemently by the administration of F.W. de Klerk. Later the South African Truth and Reconciliation Commission, led by Archbishop Desmond Tutu would find that both military and police agencies such as the Civil Cooperation Bureau and C10 based at Vlakplaas were guilty of gross human rights violations. This led the International Criminal Court to declare apartheid a crime against humanity.

Present day

In Mainland China, a system of administrative detentions called Re-education through labor (láodòng jiàoyǎng 劳动教养, abbreviated láojiào 劳教) was used to detain persons for minor crimes such as petty theft, prostitution, and trafficking illegal drugs for periods of up to four years. Re-education through labor sentences were given by the police, rather than through the judicial system.

In the Netherlands, prosecutors and tax inspectors can procure punishments without due process (Strafbeschikking), a practice that has been increasingly criticised by members of the Dutch Second Chamber, such as Michiel van Nispen. 

For many years, the Jamaican Constabulary Force has been noted for its extrajudicial killings.  With 140 police killings in a population of 3 million, "Jamaica’s police force [is] among the deadliest in the world".

It has been discussed that the use of psychiatric treatments to reduce unwanted behaviors can be seen as extrajudicial punishments, due to many side-effects associated to these treatments.

The US has been known to employ extrajudicial tactics including extraordinary rendition. Some critics use the term "torture by proxy" to describe situations in which the CIA and other US agencies have employed  rendition techniques to transfer suspected terrorists to countries known to utilize torture. While denied by the US, where it is a crime to transfer  anyone to any location for the purpose of torture, critics claim that torture has been employed with the knowledge or acquiescence of US agencies. Condoleezza Rice (then the United States Secretary of State) stated, falsely:

The CIA has been accused of operating secret detention and interrogation centres known as black sites. These are allegedly located in countries other than the US, thus evading US laws as they are outside US jurisdiction.

Human rights groups 

Many human rights organisations like Amnesty International are campaigning against extrajudicial punishment.

See also 

 Administrative detention
 Arbitrary arrest and detention
 Assassination
 Charivari
 COINTELPRO
 Death squad

 Extrajudicial prisoners of the United States
 Extrajudicial killing
 Extraordinary rendition
 Frontier justice
 Human rights
 Human Rights Watch
 Law without the state
 Lynching
 Martial law
 Non-judicial punishment
 Outlaw
 Police encounter
 Posse
 Presumption of guilt
 Prison rape
 Purge
 State of emergency
 Summary execution
 Targeted killing
 Tarring and feathering
 Terrorism
 Torture
 Vigilante
 Whitecapping

Sources

References

External links

Monitoring organizations
Amnesty International
Ansar Burney Trust (Pakistan and the Middle East)
Human Rights Watch

Capital punishment
Criminal law
Dirty wars
 
Enforced disappearance
Human rights abuses
Terrorism tactics